Liliana Rodríguez Morillo (born April 26, 1967 in Caracas) is a Venezuelan singer, songwriter, actress and television host. She is the daughter of singer and actress Lila Morillo and famous singer José Luis Rodríguez "El Puma", and older sister of Lilibeth Morillo. In the US she is known for appearances on We.TV's 2016 show My Life is a Telenovela with Maria Raquenel Portillo,  Venezuelan actor Enrique Sapene, Mexican actor Gustavo Pedraza and former Sábado Gigante co-host Alina Robert.

Biography
Liliana was part of the cast of the telenovela Maribel alongside her younger sister and mother Lila Morillo.

Filmography

Television

References 

 

20th-century Venezuelan women singers
Venezuelan telenovela actresses
Living people
1967 births
Actresses from Caracas
Singers from Caracas
21st-century Venezuelan women singers